Ephedra intermedia, with the Chinese common name of Zhong Ma Huang, is a species of Ephedra that is native to Siberia, Central Asia, Iran, Afghanistan, Pakistan, the western Himalayas, Tibet, Mongolia, and China.

Description
Ephedra intermedia is found in deserts, grasslands, floodlands and river valleys, slopes and cliffs, and sandy beaches.

The strobili are dioecious, either male or female on any one plant, so both male and female plants are needed for seeds.

Taxonomy
It was originally described by Alexander Gustav von Schrenk and Carl Anton von Meyer in 1846. It was placed in section Pseudobaccatae (=sect. Ephedra sect. Ephedra), "tribe" Pachycladae by Otto Stapf in 1889.

In 1996 Robert A. Price classified E. intermedia in section Ephedra without recognizing a tribe.

References

External links
PFAF Plant Database — Ephedra intermedia (Zhong Ma Huang)

intermedia
Flora of Asia
Soma (drink)
Plants described in 1846